The Sun Gym Gang were active in Miami, Florida, during the mid-1990s and were responsible for the murders of Frank Griga and Krisztina Furton along with the kidnapping, extortion, and attempted murder of Marc Schiller. The gang was composed mostly of bodybuilders who frequented the Sun Gym in Nashville , Florida, including Daniel Lugo and Adrian Doorbal. Pete Collins published a three-part series in the Miami New Times in 1999 and 2000 chronicling the stories of the gang titled "Pain and Gain" which was then loosely adapted into the 2013 film Pain & Gain directed by Michael Bay.

Origins  

In 1993 Daniel Lugo was the manager of the Sun Gym, a bodybuilder hangout in Miami Lakes, Florida. In 1991, Lugo had been arrested and plead guilty to fraud, serving a fifteen-month sentence in addition to a three-year federal probation period. He had been convicted of fraud for pretending to be part of a Hong Kong bank looking to invest in American small businesses—the scheme involved collecting up-front fees for loan insurance and then not delivering any loans. Noel Doorbal worked part-time at the gym alongside Lugo. During 1994, Carl Weekes moved from New York to Miami to live with his girlfriend's cousin, Stevenson Pierre. Pierre had been hired by Lugo in February 1994 to create a collection agency for overdue gym membership payments. When this didn't work out, he remained at the gym first as the back-office manager in the weight room before ending up as a desk clerk. Jorge Delgado worked with Daniel Lugo as his personal trainer at the Sun Gym. It was Delgado's relationship with Lugo that caused a rift between Delgado and the Sun Gym Gang's first victim: Marc Schiller. Jorge Delgado and Marc Schiller had been business partners since about 1991, and Schiller trusted Delgado so much that Delgado knew the alarm code and layout of Schiller's home.

Crimes

The abduction and extortion of Marc Schiller 
In a 1994 meeting, Daniel Lugo asked Noel Doorbal and Stevenson Pierre whether they were interested in making $100,000 for two days' work. According to Lugo, businessman Marc Schiller had stolen $100,000 from him and $200,000 from another gym member named Jorge Delgado. At another meeting a few days later, Delgado agreed to the plan to abduct Schiller and force him to sign over his assets, and potentially kill him. Delgado was able to give specific information about Schiller, including the codes to his house.

The gang had varying plans and made attempts to kidnap Schiller. They planned to wear ninja outfits for Halloween and knock on Schiller's door; this plan did not transpire. On an early morning in November, Doorbal, Pierre, and Weekes, dressed in black and wearing gloves and black military camouflage makeup, crawled across the lawn, planning to storm the house when Schiller went to get the papers. However, a passing car scared them off.

In total, there were seven failed abductions. The final failed abduction occurred on Thursday, November 14, 1994. After this last failed attempt, Doorbal and Weekes dropped Pierre and recruited Mario Sanchez, or "Big Mario," a former Sun Gym weightlifting instructor and licensed Florida private eye.

That same afternoon, Schiller was waiting for a prospective buyer at a Schlotzsky's franchise delicatessen he owned. When, at 4 pm, the buyer still had not turned up, Schiller left and was grabbed by three men while walking across the parking lot, who stunned him with tasers and then punched him and forced him into a van. The Sun Gym gang then took Schiller to Delgado's warehouse. That evening, they retrieved Schiller's car from the Deli parking lot and drove it to the warehouse. That first evening the gang made Schiller call his wife and tell her to go with his children to Colombia, giving the gang access to his house. For weeks, the gang made Schiller tell a series of stories and, under pressure, sign over all of his assets, making dozens of requests for his autographs. Initially planned as a two-day abduction, the abduction went over weeks as they converted assets from Switzerland and the Cayman Islands. The last money transfer was made on December 10. Finally, the gang decided they would kill Schiller with a 2 million dollars MetLife Insurance policy designated to Lugo's ex-wife Lillian Torres as the new beneficiary.

The gang planned to get Schiller drunk over a few days and send him out in his car in a fatal crash. At 2:30 am on December 15, after three days of forced drinking, Schiller was placed into the passenger seat of his car with Lugo driving while Weekes and Doorbal followed in the Camry. A crash site was chosen three blocks south of Schlotzky's. Schiller was then strapped into the driver's seat, and Lugo moved into the passenger side and stomped the gas pedal and steered the vehicle toward a concrete utility pole jumping out just before the collision. When Lugo inspected the wreckage, Schiller was alive but unconscious. Lugo then splashed gasoline over him and lit it on fire, however, Schiller opened the door and climbed out of the car. The gang chased him in their cars, nailing him against a wall. They almost went back to hit Schiller again, but another car approached, causing them to run away.

Schiller was admitted into the hospital on December 16, 1994, being treated as a John Doe and possible DUI case.  Meanwhile, the Sun Gym Gang, after hearing of no one being admitted into the morgue, started calling the area hospitals. They discovered that Schiller was at South Miami Hospital and in a critical but stable condition. The gang visited the hospital intending to kill Schiller, but he had already been transferred to Jackson Memorial Hospital.

By early January 1995, Lugo moved into Schiller's home that D&J International now owned, a Bahamian Company set up by Lugo in the year prior. He told residents of the neighborhood that his name was “Tom” and that he and the other gang members were members of the US Security Forces. According to them, Marc Schiller had run into legal trouble and had been deported along with his family. The house was now confiscated and became government property.

Winston Lee 
In 1994 Daniel Lugo again planned to extort and kidnap Winston Lee, a Jamaican man who frequented Sun Gym. However, this plan never transpired.

Abduction, attempted extortion, and murders of Frank Griga and Krisztina Furton 
 
Through Noel Doorbal, the gang were informed of another wealthy man, Hungarian Frank Griga who had made his fortune by running a phone-sex empire.     Through a past girlfriend, Doorbal had been introduced to Attila Weiland, who knew Griga and  introduced Doorbal and his "cousin" Daniel Lugo to Griga on May 20, 1995. Doorbal convinced Lugo to form a plan to kidnap and extort the couple. At this meeting, Lugo and Doorbal posed as serious business men, offering Griga investment opportunities.
 
Lugo involved his girlfriend, Sabina Petrescu, who believed that Lugo was a Central Intelligence Agency agent and that she was assisting him in his mission to capture a Hungarian businessman who was guilty of using women for sex and circumventing US tax laws.
 
On May 25, 1995, after several meetings,  Doorbal killed Griga during a fight at his apartment. The gang planned to bring Griga back to a warehouse where they could begin to extort him as they had Schiller; however, they were frustrated in their plan when they accidentally killed the victim early. Krisztina Furton, Griga's girlfriend, was also at the apartment talking to Lugo in a separate room to Doorbal and Griga. After witnessing her partner murdered, she was injected with Rompun - a horse tranquilliser - by Lugo. The gang began to attempt to extract information from Furton regarding the codes which would grant entry into Griga's home, whilst continuing to inject her with Rompun. After this, Furton stopped supplying them with information. The third dose of tranquilizer was administered, resulting in her death.
 
The next day – May 26, 1995 – Griga's body was concealed in Marc Schiller's stolen couch and Furton's body in a U-Haul clothing box. Both were placed into the back of a van, and Delgado, Lugo, and Doorbal drove to Lugo's Hialeah warehouse. It was here that the gang dismembered and disposed of the bodies of Griga and Furton, with Doorbal doing most of the work.

Downfall 
After his ordeal, Marc Schiller hired Miami private investigator Ed Du Bois to investigate his kidnapping and missing finances. At the same time, he remained in Colombia. When Du Bois initially brought Schiller's ordeal to the Miami police, they were skeptical and didn't believe Schiller's story. Therefore, they only made minor inquiries into the case.

The morning after the disappearance of Griga and Furton, housekeeper Eszter Toth arrived at Griga's house. She was shocked to find their dog barking unattended, sparking her suspicions. She acquired the help of Judi Bartusz — a friend of Furton — and the two entered the empty house together. Shortly following, Bartusz contacted their mutual Hungarian friends in the Miami area to see if they knew the couple's whereabouts. After some time, the Golden Beach Police Department were called. At 7:30 am, on May 31, 1995, Lloyd Alvarez, a friend of Griga's, spotted Griga's yellow Lamborghini travelling in a convoy between two other cars. He followed the trio of cars, and recognised Daniel Lugo in the Mercedes. Beatriz Weiland and Attila Weiland were contacted by police, who began speaking to them.

Eight days after the disappearance of Griga and Furton, Capt. Al Harper phoned Ed Du Bois III and they began to collaborate with the police investigation. On Friday June 2, Marc Schiller returned to Miami, two months after he had first told investigators his story. The next morning, Metro–Dade police served warrants on the houses of Daniel Lugo, Jorge Delgado, Noel Doorbal and John Mese. Lugo had already fled to the Bahamas, but was arrested five days later in Nassau by a multi-agency task force, who brought him back on a commercial flight to Miami.

On June 10, Lugo agreed to reveal the hiding place of the bodies in return for the police mentioning his helpfulness to a jury. He brought them to the submerged barrels in Southwest Miami. However, the drums did not contain the victims' heads, hands, and feet which were crucial to the identification. Following this event, Lugo ceased cooperation with the police.

The body of Furton was later identified through her breast implants' serial number, which was matched to the records held by her plastic surgeon. A month later, information about the missing body parts was supplied by an anonymous caller.

Police also arrested Carl Weekes and Stevenson Pierre. John Mese was returned to police custody after the initial interrogation. Sabina Petrescu and Cindy Eldridge also faced charges.

Trial and convictions 
The trials of Daniel Lugo, Noel "Adrian" Doorbal and John Mese occurred simultaneously with two juries picked - one listening to the evidence against Lugo and a second to listen to the evidence against Doorbal and Mese.  The trial, which began on February 24, 1998 was the longest and most expensive criminal trial in the history of Dade County. It featured more than 1200 pieces of physical evidence and 98 witnesses.

Daniel Lugo 
On October 2, 1996, Daniel Lugo was indicted on 46 counts and pleaded guilty to all of the charges of indictment, these were: (VII-7- missing. 45 counts.Count I            Conspiracy to Commit Racketeering

Count II          Racketeering

Count III         First-Degree Murder (Furton)

Count IV         First-Degree Murder (Griga)

Count V          Kidnapping

Count VI         Kidnapping

Count VIII      Attempted Extortion

Count IX         Grand Theft Auto

Count X          Attempted First-Degree Murder

Count XI         Armed Kidnapping

Count XII       Armed Robbery

Count XIII      Burglary

Count XIV      Grand Theft (Second-Degree)

Count XV       Grand Theft Auto

Count XVI      Possession of an Identification Plate

Count XVII    Arson

Count XVIII   Extortion

Count XIX      Money Laundering (Counts XIX – XXVII)                  

Count XXVIII Forgery (Counts XXVIII, XXXI, XXXIV, XXVII, XL, XLIII)

Count XXX    Uttering a Forged Instrument (Counts XXX, XXIII, XXXVI, IXL, XLII, XLV)

Count XLVI   Conspiracy to Commit a First-Degree Felony

He remains on death row for the murders of Griga and Krisztina Furton and has made multiple unsuccessful appeals against his sentence.

Noel "Adrian" Doorbal 
On October 2, 1996, Doorbal was indicted and sentenced to the following counts on July 17, 1998:Count I            Conspiracy to Commit Racketeering –  30 years

Count II          Racketeering – Life Imprisonment 

Count III         First-Degree Murder (Furton) – Death

Count IV         First-Degree Murder (Griga) – Death

Count V          Kidnapping –  Life imprisonment

Count VI         Kidnapping –  Life imprisonment

Count VIII      Attempted Extortion – 5 years

Count IX         Grand Theft Auto – 5 years

Count X          Attempted First-Degree Murder – Life imprisonment

Count XI         Armed Kidnapping – Life imprisonment

Count XII       Armed Robbery – Life imprisonment

Count XIII      Burglary – 15 years

Count XIV      Grand Theft (Second-Degree) – 15 years

Count XVII    Arson – 30 years

Count XVIII   Extortion – 30 years

Count XLVI   Conspiracy to Commit a First-Degree Felony – 15 years

Because of changes to capital punishment laws, Doorbal's death sentence was overturned in 2017.

John Mese 
Mese was indicted on October 2, 1996, for the kidnapping, extortion, and murders of Furton and Griga in addition to crimes against Schiller. On July 20, 1998, Mese was sentenced to 56 years imprisonment for the kidnapping and extortion of Schiller, after a judge set aside the convictions for the Griga and Furton crimes.

Mese appealed, and the State cross-appealed the sentence to the Florida District Court of Appeal, Third District. The District Court of Appeal Judge ruled that at trial, the judge had improperly set aside the two Racketeer Influenced and Corrupt Organisation convictions and ordered a new sentencing hearing to occur on those counts. On 15 January 2003, Mese was sentenced to 30 years imprisonment for one count of Conspiracy to Commit Racketeering. he died of a stroke in 2004.

Jorge Delgado 
In return for testifying in favor of the state, Delgado was sentenced to two prison terms of 5 and 15 years. He served only seven years in jail and was released from the Everglades Correctional Institution in West Dade on September 27, 2002. In 2008, he was arrested for felony grand theft, receiving one year of probation.

John Raimondo 
Raimondo was indicted on one count each of Conspiracy to Commit Racketeering, First-degree Murder (Furton), Kidnapping (Furton) and attempted extortion. He was convicted to one count of kidnapping and was sentenced to 8 years He was released in 2002.

Following the release of the Pain & Gain film, Raimondo spoke to the Miami New Times about the film.

References 

Gangs in Florida